Elachista sarota is a moth of the family Elachistidae. It is found in Australia.

References

Moths described in 2011
Endemic fauna of Australia
sarota
Moths of Australia
Taxa named by Lauri Kaila